Riders is a 1985 novel written by the English author Jilly Cooper.  It is the first of a series of romance novels known as the Rutshire Chronicles, which are set in the fictional English county of Rutshire.  The story focuses on the lives of a group of top show jumping stars and follows the ups and downs of both their personal and professional lives.  It was turned into a television film, Riders (1993), directed by Gabrielle Beaumont for Anglia Television and broadcast on the ITV Network.

On 5 November 2019 BBC News included Riders on its list of the 100 most inspiring novels.

Plot
Set against the backdrop of the English Cotswolds countryside, Riders follows the fortunes of a group of fame and money hungry show jumping stars.

Jake Lovell, the gypsy-born hero of the novel, is a brilliant horseman desperately seeking revenge for years of bullying at the hands of the glamorous but brutish aristocrat Rupert Campbell-Black.  With the help of his rich debutante wife, Tory Maxwell, he is able to set himself up his own yard and begins building a reputation on the show-jumping circuit.  Meanwhile, Rupert is content living the jet-set lifestyle with best friend Billy Lloyd-Foxe, plus a string of beautiful women, horses and dogs. Meeting his beautiful wife, Helen Macaulay, does little to curb his promiscuity and he eventually falls back into a life of parties, alcohol, and casual sex.

When Jake and Rupert meet again for the first time since school, old rivalries are reawakened as they fight it out to prove who is the greater horseman and, perhaps more importantly, the greater lover. Along the way, Cooper gives us a peek into the lives of this close-knit community of tops riders, their horses, grooms and families.  We see the highs and lows of life in the equestrian world, but who will eventually come out on top in the final showdown at the Los Angeles Olympics.

Cover
When first published in 1985 the book's cover, somewhat controversially, depicted “a man’s hand resting intimately on the seat of a woman’s jodhpurs.” The 2015 30th anniversary edition's toned-down cover artwork moved the male hand from where it was firmly gripping the female rider's bottom to a much higher position nearer to her hip, generating some backlash from fans.

References

Novels by Jilly Cooper
1985 British novels
Novels about horses